Ultimate Zero Tour - Live is a live album by Eddie Jobson and his U-Z Project. The album is compiled from 2009 performances in Poland, Russia, and the United States by various line-ups. Musicians include John Wetton, Tony Levin, Greg Howe, Trey Gunn, Marco Minnemann and Simon Phillips. The album marks the first time Jobson and Wetton publicly collaborated since the breakup of U.K. in 1979.

Tracks include compositions originally performed by UK, including "The Sahara of Snow", a song that ended up on Bill Bruford's second solo album "One of a Kind" as well as King Crimson and Mahavishnu Orchestra covers and five solo spots.

The album was first released on 26 November 2010 in Japan.  The album was produced and engineered by Jobson himself.

Track listing
All songs written by Eddie Jobson except as noted.

Personnel
Eddie Jobson - keyboards, electric violin (CD1 1-5, 8-10, CD2 1-8)
Marco Minnemann - drums (CD1 1-4, 7-10, CD2 2, 4, 6-8)
John Wetton - vocals, bass, acoustic guitar (CD1 3-4, 6, 8-10, CD2 6-8)
Tony Levin - stick (CD1 3-4, 6, 8-10, CD2 1, 7-8)
Greg Howe - guitar (CD1 1-4, 8-10, CD2 2, 4, 7-8)
Ric Fierabracci- bass (CD1 1-2 5, CD2 2)
Simon Phillips - drums (CD2 4)
Trey Gunn - touch guitar (CD2 3-4)

References

External links 
 Official UKZ website
 Official Eddie Jobson website
 Official Jobson subscription fanclub

2010 live albums
Eddie Jobson albums